Taylor McKeown (born 17 March 1995) is a former Australian competitive swimmer. She won a gold medal in the 200 metre breaststroke at the 2014 Commonwealth Games, and a silver medal at the 4 × 100 m medley relay during the 2016 Summer Olympics. McKeown also represented Australia in both the 100m breaststroke, and 200m breaststroke, qualifying fastest for the final and finishing in 5th in the 2016 Summer Olympics.  She is a University of Sunshine Coast student.

In 2010, Taylor won her first national titles in the 100m and 200m breaststroke at the age of 15. Since then Taylor has dominated breaststroke and individual medley events throughout the age group swimming years. She won multiple medals and representing Australia on many junior teams events.

Taylor injured her knee prior to the 2018 Gold Coast Commonwealth Games which required surgery. Taylor struggled throughout 2018 and left her coach of 13 years. She settled on the Gold Coast in early 2019 training with her new coach Michael Bohl,

Taylor is the older sister of Olympic champion swimmer, Kaylee McKeown. After the 2022 Commonwealth Games in Birmingham, Taylor announced her retirement from competitive swimming.

References

External links
 
 
 
 
 

1995 births
Living people
Sportswomen from Queensland
Australian female breaststroke swimmers
Swimmers at the 2014 Commonwealth Games
Swimmers at the 2022 Commonwealth Games
Commonwealth Games medallists in swimming
Commonwealth Games gold medallists for Australia
World Aquatics Championships medalists in swimming
Swimmers at the 2016 Summer Olympics
Olympic swimmers of Australia
Olympic silver medalists for Australia
Medalists at the 2016 Summer Olympics
Olympic silver medalists in swimming
21st-century Australian women
Medallists at the 2014 Commonwealth Games